Coach Trip 17, also known as Coach Trip: Road to Tenerife is the seventeenth series of Coach Trip in the United Kingdom. The series was confirmed by E4 during the last series (Road to Zante). Filming took place between 1 September and 22 October 2017. The series once again consists of 40 episodes, the same as the previous series, and follow the "Road to..." format. The series aired on E4 from 8 January to 2 March 2018 for 40 episodes. The first seven couples were confirmed on 29 December 2017.

Contestants

Voting history

Notes
 On Day 6, Ellie & Ryan were immune from the vote after winning the mornings activity.

 On Day 11, Brendan announced that the couple that received a yellow card at the vote would be able to select another couple to automatically receive a yellow card. Dan & Lewis received their second yellow card, eliminating them from the trip and they chose Ben & Teleka to receive a yellow card which also eliminated them from the trip.

 On Day 17, Brendan announced that the two couples with the most votes would receive a yellow card.

 On Day 22, Brendan announced that the next couple to receive a red card would be able to choose another couple to receive a red card also. On that same day, Lorna & Sam received a red card and they chose Kamen & Remus to also receive a red card.

 On Day 26, Brendan announced that there would be a twist in every vote this week.

 On Day 26, Brendan announced that the winners of the morning activity, would be able to cast a double vote. Ella & Simon and James & Matt won the activity, therefore their votes were counted twice.

 On Day 27, Brendan announced that the vote would be a double yellow card vote, meaning each couple would vote twice.

 On Day 28, Brendan announced that only the new couples would vote, and that they would vote twice.

 On Day 29, Brendan announced that the couple with the most votes would win immunity until the end of the trip.

 On Day 30, Brendan announced that the couple with the most votes would receive an instant red card.

 On Day 37, Brendan announced that all couples would vote as normal, however only one  couple's vote selected at random would count, and that the couple they had voted for would receive an instant red card.

The trip by day

References

2018 British television seasons
Coach Trip series
Television shows set in France
Television shows set in Portugal
Television shows set in Spain